The Floral Hall is a historic community building in the city of Bowling Green, Ohio, United States.  Constructed in the 1880s for one of two competing county fairs, it is typical of exhibition buildings from the period.  Although no longer used for the county fair, it has been named a historic site.

History

Background
The first Wood County fair was held in 1851 in Bowling Green, although the next five years saw it held also at Perrysburg and Portageville, due partially to dissension among the sponsoring Agricultural Society members and partially to the presence of diseases such as cholera and ague in the different grounds.  The board purchased land at Tontogany for permanent fair grounds after the end of the Civil War, but Bowling Green still retained the memory of holding the county fair.  This state of affairs ultimately induced the formation of a separate Wood County Fair Company in Bowling Green, which obtained land in Bowling Green and began holding fairs in 1881, becoming successful enough that the Agricultural Society began merger talks in 1885.  From 1884 until 1894, their receipts grew from $3,889.30 to $7,945.99.

Usage
The Floral Hall was constructed in 1884 at the fairgrounds in Bowling Green; it originally held horticultural exhibits, although in the 20th century it was renamed "Needle Hall" after it began hosting needlework exhibitions.  In later years, the fair moved to another location, the original grounds were converted into a city park, and all other buildings from the fairgrounds were eventually destroyed.  However, the city retained the floral/needle hall, changing it into a picnic shelter and carefully attending to the building's upkeep.

Architecture
Built of wood, the building sits on a brick foundation and is covered with a shingled roof.  Stone elements are also present, and the water table is built of wood.  One story tall, the hall is an octagonal structure, typical of Ohio floral halls from the period; its plan is essentially a modified Greek cross.  The doors and other parts of the facade bear Stick-style detailing.

In 1982, the former floral/needle hall was listed on the National Register of Historic Places, qualifying both because of its architecture and because of its place in local history.  It is one of five National Register-listed locations in Bowling Green, and one of thirty-one in Wood County.  Another Register-listed octagonal floral hall is located on the Morrow County fairgrounds in Mount Gilead.

References

Buildings and structures completed in 1884
Buildings and structures in Wood County, Ohio
National Register of Historic Places in Wood County, Ohio
Convention centers in Ohio
Municipal parks in the United States
Octagonal buildings in the United States
Tourist attractions in Wood County, Ohio
Wooden buildings and structures in the United States
Event venues on the National Register of Historic Places in Ohio
Bowling Green, Ohio